The Stabrie Grocery is a building located at 501 North 13th Street in the NoDo area of Downtown Omaha, Nebraska. Built in 1882, it was added to the National Register of Historic Places in 2007.

About
When it originally opened in 1883, the building was near Omaha's notorious Burnt District. After originally serving as a grocery, the building later was home to saloons, a grocery wholesaler and the Central Mattress Company factory, which was there for more than 50 years. Today it is the Old Mattress Factory Bar and Grill.

See also
 History of Omaha

References

National Register of Historic Places in Omaha, Nebraska
Commercial buildings on the National Register of Historic Places in Nebraska
Grocery store buildings